Peter Reginato (born August 19, 1945), is an American abstract sculptor and painter.

Reginato was born in Dallas, Texas, but grew up in the hills outside Oakland, California, attending the San Francisco Art Institute from 1963 to 1966.

In 1970 and in 1973 his work was included in the Whitney Biennial.

Exhibitions 

His work has been shown at:  
 The Butler Institute of American Art, Youngstown, Ohio

Collections 
Reginato has work in the permanent collections of the following: 
 Allen Art Center, Houston, Texas
 Brown University 
 The Corcoran Gallery of Art
 The Hirshorn Museum and Sculpture Garden, Smithsonian Institution, Washington, D.C.
 IBM Corporation
 The John and Mable Ringling Museum of Art
 Mary and Leigh Block Museum of Art at Northwestern University
 The Mead Art Museum, Amherst College, Massachusetts 
 The Metropolitan Museum of Art
 The Mint Museum of Art
 The Museum of Fine Arts, Boston
 The Museum of Fine Arts, Houston

References

External links
Official website

1945 births
Artists from New York City
American contemporary artists
20th-century American sculptors
20th-century American male artists
21st-century American sculptors
21st-century American male artists
American male sculptors
Living people
Art Students League of New York faculty
San Francisco Art Institute alumni
People from Manhattan
Sculptors from New York (state)